This is the results breakdown of the 2017 United Kingdom general election.

Vote shares

A post-election analysis of Lord Ashcroft of inter-party swing (between specific parties):

Seats which changed hands

Conservative to Labour
Battersea
Bedford
Brighton Kemptown
Bristol North West
Bury North
Canterbury
Cardiff North
Colne Valley
Crewe and Nantwich
Croydon Central
Derby North
Enfield Southgate
Gower
High Peak
Ipswich
Keighley
Kensington
Lincoln
Peterborough
Plymouth Sutton and Devonport
Portsmouth South
Reading East
Stockton South
Stroud
Vale of Clwyd
Warrington South
Warwick and Leamington
Weaver Vale

SNP to Conservative
Aberdeen South
Aberdeenshire West & Kincardine
Angus
Ayr, Carrick and Cumnock
Banff and Buchan
Berwickshire, Roxburgh and Selkirk
Dumfries and Galloway
Gordon
Moray
Ochil and South Perthshire
Renfrewshire East
Stirling

SNP to Labour
Coatbridge, Chryston and Bellshill
East Lothian
Glasgow North East
Kirkcaldy and Cowdenbeath
Midlothian
Rutherglen and Hamilton West

Labour to Conservative
Copeland
Derbyshire North East
Mansfield
Middlesbrough South and Cleveland East
Stoke-on-Trent South
Walsall North

Conservative to Liberal Democrat
Bath
Eastbourne
Kingston and Surbiton
Oxford West and Abingdon
Twickenham

SNP to Liberal Democrat
Caithness, Sutherland and Easter Ross
Dunbartonshire East
Edinburgh West

Liberal Democrat to Labour
Leeds North West
Sheffield Hallam

SDLP to Sinn Féin
Foyle
South Down

Liberal Democrat to Conservative
Southport

UKIP to Conservative
Clacton

Ulster Unionist to Sinn Féin
Fermanagh and South Tyrone

SDLP to Democratic Unionist
Belfast South

Ulster Unionist to Democratic Unionist
South Antrim

Liberal Democrat to Plaid Cymru
Ceredigion

England

Northern Ireland

Scotland

Wales

Notes

References

2017 United Kingdom general election
Election results in the United Kingdom